Down to Mars was a Filipino boy band that consists of interracial 4 Filipino 1 Japanese 1 Chinese & 1 Korean. The group is regular in GMA 7's variety show Party Pilipinas. The group was chosen by the Philippines Department Of Tourism to perform at Expo 2012 during the National Day Of Korea at Yeosu, South Korea on July 22, 2012.

Discography

References

External links
 

Filipino boy bands
Filipino pop music groups
Musical groups from Metro Manila
Musical groups established in 2011
Musical groups disestablished in 2017
2011 establishments in the Philippines
GMA Network personalities